Sylvie Oussenko (born 5 June 1945) is a contemporary French mezzo-soprano and writer.

Biography  

She made her stage debut in 1977 as Mélisande in Debussy's Pelléas et Mélisande at Besançon.

She worked on the repertoire with vocal coach Irène Aïtoff, with whom she gave her first recital devoted to lieder and melodies by Franz Liszt in 1978: many others followed. At the same time, she obtained a postgraduate diploma in musicology and psychology at the Paris-Sorbonne University.

Then, opting for recital and oratorio, she created many melodies by Roger Calmel , Georges Delerue, Lucie Robert-Diessel, Noël Lee, Pierrette Mari, etc. that she recorded for the Cologne radio station (WDR III).

She works on an ongoing basis with pianists Françoise Tillard, Noël Lee, Lucie Robert-Diessel, and conductor Dominique Fanal.

Since the 1990s, she has devoted part of her activities to pedagogy and literature: since 2007, she has published fiction, poetry and music writings on a regular basis. She is also the author of several plays.

In 2013, the Quatre Mythologiques are put on music by Michel Decoust, song cycle on poems by Sylvie Oussenko (excerpts from the collection Pèlerinages).

On 10 December 2013, she married baritone Gabriel Bacquier.

Distinctions  
 Chevalier of the Ordre des Arts et des Lettres

Publications   
 Les Madrigaux de Bellone (short stories), éditions France Univers, 2007
 Chopin, 2009
 L'Opéra tout simplement, Eyrolles, 2009
 Schumann, Eyrolles - 2010
 Pèlerinages, preface and illustrations by Gabriel Bacquier (poem), France Univers, 2010.
 Gabriel Bacquier, le génie de l'Interprétation (biographical essay), éditions MJW Fédition, 2011.
 Richard Wagner, in collaboration with François Poncet, Eyrolles, 2013
 Verdi, in collaboration with Gabriel Bacquier, Eyrolles, 2013

Translations
 Ludwig Tieck: Les Fils Aymon, Les Amours de la Belle Maguelone et de Pierre de Provence, La légende de Mélusine, Montpellier, éditions Grèges, 2008

Discography  
 Mélodies italiennes with Thierry Macé, piano (Concord, 1997) 
 Berlioz' Les nuits d'été and Wagner's Wesendonck Lieder with Noël Lee, piano (Tam Attitudes, 2001)

References

External links 
Sylvie Oussenko on Eyrolles
 Sylvie Oussenko, mezzo-soprano, musicologue et poète
 Sylvie Oussenko
 Rencontre littéraire avec Gabriek Pasquier et Sylvie Oussenko

21st-century French women writers
French operatic mezzo-sopranos
1945 births
Living people
Chevaliers of the Ordre des Arts et des Lettres